Kliucharky is a village in Ukraine located about 4 miles south west of Mukacheve in Zakarpattia Oblast. Other spellings/names for Klyucharki are: Kluĉárky, Kljucsarki, Klyucharky, and Pavsino. In Yiddish, Kliucharky was referred to as Klicherkes. In 2001, its population was 2,632.

History
The town was part of the Kingdom of Hungary (11th century - 1918 and 1938–1944) with the name of Várkulcsa in the Bereg megyé (county) and Munkácsi járás (district), next part of Czechoslovakia (1918–1938) with the name of Klucsárka in Podkarpatská Rus (Sub-Carpathia), then part of the Soviet Union (Ukraine) (1945–1993) with the name of Kljuĉárky and since 1993 known as Klyucharki in the Mukachevskiy (Mukachivs'kyy) rayon (district) and the Zakarpats'ka oblast (county) of Ukraine.

External links
Kliucharky - ShtetLink

Villages in Mukachevo Raion